The 2000 Africa Cup (officially called at those time "Africa Top Six") was the first edition of highest level rugby union tournament in Africa.

Only five teams were involved due to the withdrawal of the Ivory Coast. South Africa participated with an Under-23 amateurs team.

The teams were divided in two pool played on home away basis.

Regional pools

Pool South

Pool North

Final

Citations

References 
Rugby Africa: ABOUT US n.d., viewed 8 April 2018, http://www.rugbyafrique.com/about-us/

SA U23 away to Morocco for final, news 24 archives 2001, viewed 8 April 2018, https://www.news24.com/

South Africa Match results (2000), ESPN Scrum n.d., viewed 8 April 2018, http://stats.espnscrum.com/scrum/rugby/records/team/match_results.html?id=2000;team=5;type=year

External links 

 Rugbyafrique
 SA Rugby

2000
2000 rugby union tournaments for national teams
2000 in African rugby union